Modern is  Wolfgang Voigt's first release under the Gas alias. It is an EP, released in 1995 on the Profan label. Unlike later releases by Gas, Modern does not feature forest photography in the liner notes; and the songs are titled.

Track listing

1995 EPs
Ambient EPs
Electronic EPs
Gas (musician) albums